Pantea Panahiha (born 29 November 1977) is an Iranian actress and script supervisor. She is best known for acting in Breath (2016), which was selected as the Iranian entry for the Best Foreign Language Film at the 90th Academy Awards, but was not nominated.

Filmography

Film

Web

Television

Awards and nominations

References

External links 

1977 births
Living people
People from Tehran
Actresses from Tehran
Iranian film actresses
Iranian stage actresses